Dimmed Lights (Italian:Luci sommerse) is a 1934 Italian drama film directed by Adelqui Migliar and starring Fosco Giachetti, Nelly Corradi and Laura Nucci. The film was released in the United States in 1936, and is sometimes dated by that year.

The film's sets were designed by the art director Guido Fiorini.

Cast
 Fosco Giachetti as Lord Spider 
 Nelly Corradi as Adriana d'Aurigny  
 Laura Nucci as The vamp  
 Augusto Marcacci 
 Yvonne Sandner 
 Carlo Reiter
 Raimondo Van Riel 
 Amina Pirani Maggi 
 Danilo Calamai 
 Arturo Cellini 
 Carlo Chertier 
 Tonio Masini 
 Arturo Vitaletti

References

Bibliography 
 Plazaola, Luis Trelles. South American Cinema. La Editorial, UPR, 1989.

External links 

1934 films
Italian drama films
1934 drama films
1930s Italian-language films
Films directed by Adelqui Migliar
Italian black-and-white films
1930s Italian films